The Brady-Brady House, at 8395 South 1000 East in Sandy, Utah, was built in 1930.  It was listed on the National Register of Historic Places in 2004.  The listing included two contributing buildings.

It is a Tudor Revival-style house.

References

National Register of Historic Places in Salt Lake County, Utah
Tudor Revival architecture in the United States
Buildings and structures completed in 1930